Ademaga Mešcić or Adem Aga Mešcić (25 March 1868 – 1 July 1945) was a Bosnian politician and military officer who served in the Austro-Hungarian Schutzkorps, and later a member of the Ustaše government of the Independent State of Croatia for Bosnian region during World War II.

Ottoman Bosnia
Mešcić was married without children, and considered himself a Muslim Croat. He was the publisher of Behar, a Bosnian Muslim political journal published in the period 1900–11.

Austrian annexation of Bosnia and Herzegovina
Mešcić belonged to a Croatian-Muslim bloc installed in 1908 by the government of Austria-Hungary to support its annexation of Bosnia and Herzegovina. As a Germanophile, he was a leader of the Muslim supporters of the annexation of Bosnia and Herzegovina who renounced any kind of autonomy, including one based on religion. In 1908, he established the Muslim Progressive Party, which had a pro-Croat orientation. He wrote and published a work titled "Moj odgovor bezimenim klevetnicima".

First World War
At the beginning of World War I he was military commander in the Schutzkorps, an auxiliary volunteer militia established in Bosnia and Herzegovina by the Austro-Hungarian authorities. The unit he organized and commanded was also known as "Ademaga's Army". After the war Mešcić was a poultry trader in Tešanj.

Second World War
During World War II, he belonged to a narrow circle of Muslims who were supporters of the Independent State of Croatia and was vice-president of its government with his seat in Banja Luka. At the end of the war he was part of the Independent State of Croatia evacuation to Austria, only to be imprisoned by British forces, who extradited him to the new Yugoslav communist government.

Trial and death
After the war he was tried. In his closing statement he said that he was only a loyal citizen of the Ottoman sultan, Austrian emperor and Yugoslav king Karađorđević in turn, emphasizing his willingness to continue his loyal service, now to the new communist government. Mešcić was sentenced to life in prison, where he died in 1945.

References

1868 births
1945 deaths
People from Tešanj
Bosnia and Herzegovina people of World War I
Austro-Hungarian military personnel of World War I
Ustaše
Bosnia and Herzegovina politicians
Bosnian Muslim collaborators with Nazi Germany
Bosnian Muslim collaborators with Fascist Italy
Genocide of Serbs in the Independent State of Croatia perpetrators
Bosniaks of Bosnia and Herzegovina convicted of war crimes
People extradited to Yugoslavia
Yugoslav prisoners sentenced to life imprisonment
Prisoners who died in Yugoslav detention
Yugoslav people who died in prison custody
Croatian Muslims